Noah Brown (born January 6, 1996) is an American football wide receiver for the Houston Texans of the National Football League (NFL). He played college football at Ohio State.

Early years
A resident of the Flanders section of Mount Olive Township, New Jersey, Brown attended Pope John XXIII Regional High School in Sparta, New Jersey. He missed his sophomore season after breaking his ribs in the first game. As a junior, he had 41 receptions for 630 yards and six touchdowns.

As a senior, he recorded 41 receptions for 857 yards, 14 receiving touchdowns and 7 rushing touchdowns, helping his team reach the Non-Public Group III final and receiving All-New Jersey honors by the Newark Star-Ledger. He committed to Ohio State University to play college football. He finished with over 3,000 all-purpose yards and 42 touchdowns, after playing at wide receiver, running back and kick returner.

Recruitment
Brown was a highly sought after prospect that received many offers from Virginia Tech, Notre Dame, Penn State, Michigan State, Pittsburgh, and USC. He had multiple visits to Columbus in 2013 and opted to shut down his recruiting early and commit to Ohio State five months before National Signing Day.

College career
As a true freshman in 2014, he played in all 14 games in a backup role, including the 2015 College Football Playoff National Championship victory over Oregon. He had one reception for nine yards and one run for a 4-yard loss, while playing wide receiver, H-back and special teams.

The next year, he excelled in spring practice and was expected to earn the starting wide receiver job, until suffering a broken left tibia and fibula late in fall camp during a non-contact drill, forcing him to redshirt for the 2015 season. The injury was serious enough to require two separate surgeries.

As a sophomore in 2016, Brown returned and started in all 13 games. He had 32 receptions (second on the team) for 402 yards and 7 touchdowns (tied for the team lead). In the third game against the University of Oklahoma, he tied a school record with 4 receiving touchdowns, while totaling 5 receptions for 72 yards. After the season, he decided to forgo his remaining two years of eligibility and enter the 2017 NFL Draft.

Professional career
On January 7, 2017, Brown announced via Twitter that he decided to forgo his senior season and enter the 2017 NFL Draft. Many analysts were surprised he decided to enter the draft and opt out of his last two years of remaining eligibility, due to his limited experience as a one-year starter and his low draft projection. He was one of 58 collegiate wide receivers to attend the NFL Scouting Combine in Indianapolis, Indiana. Brown chose to only perform the three-cone drill, short shuttle, and bench press. He tied for second in the bench press behind Shepherd's Billy Brown who had 23 reps, but ended up playing tight end in the NFL.

On March 23, 2017, Brown attended Ohio State's pro day, along with Marshon Lattimore, Gareon Conley, Raekwon McMillan, Curtis Samuel, and five other prospects. He only performed the 40-yard dash, 20-yard dash, and 10-yard dash as scouts and team representatives from all 32 NFL teams looked on, including head coaches: Bill Belichick (Patriots), Mike Tomlin (Steelers), Hue Jackson (Browns), Mike Mularkey (Titans), Sean Payton (Saints), Jim Caldwell (Lions), and Marvin Lewis (Bengals). At the conclusion of the pre-draft process, Brown was projected to be a fifth or sixth round pick by NFL draft experts and scouts. He was ranked as the 27th best wide receiver prospect in the draft by NFLDraftScout.com.

Dallas Cowboys
Brown was selected by the  Dallas Cowboys in the seventh round (239th overall) of the 2017 NFL Draft. He was the 31st wide receiver drafted in 2017 and was the second wide receiver selected by the Cowboys after North Carolina's Ryan Switzer. Dallas Cowboys' owner Jerry Jones stated that running back Ezekiel Elliott was the main reason they drafted Brown after Elliot continually advocated for him and convinced them he had a lot of talent to bring to the team. Brown was teammates with Elliot at Ohio State.

2017
On May 11, 2017, the Dallas Cowboys signed Brown to a four-year, $2.47 million contract that includes a signing bonus of $71,938.

Throughout training camp, Brown competed for a roster spot as the fifth or sixth wide receiver on the Cowboys' depth chart. He competed against Brice Butler, Lucky Whitehead, Andy Jones, and Lance Lenoir. Head coach Jason Garrett named Brown the sixth wide receiver on the Cowboys' depth chart, behind Dez Bryant, Terrance Williams, Cole Beasley, Brice Butler, and Ryan Switzer.

He made his professional regular season debut in the Cowboys' Week 2 42–17 loss at the Denver Broncos. The following week, he made his first career reception during the Cowboys' 28–17 victory at the Arizona Cardinals. His reception came off a pass by quarterback Dak Prescott and he gained 13 yards before  being tackled by Tyrann Mathieu. On November 19, 2017, Brown caught a pass for a season-long 14 yards during a 37–9 loss to the Philadelphia Eagles.

His contributions came from blocking downfield for the running game and on special teams, where he used his 6–2, 225-pound frame to his advantage. In Week 16, his blocking ability secured his first career start in the Cowboys 21–12 loss to the Seattle Seahawks, as the offense opened with 3 receivers. He finished his rookie season with four receptions for 33 receiving yards in 13 games with one start. He was declared inactive in 3 contests.

2018
Brown missed most of training camp and preseason with a hamstring injury. On September 3, 2018, he was placed on injured reserve. On November 9, 2018, he was activated off injured reserve. He started in the last 2 games of the season. Brown was mostly used for his blocking abilities, appearing in 8 games with 2 starts, while registering 5 receptions for 54 yards and 5 special teams tackles (seventh on the team).

2019
Brown began training camp on the physically unable to perform list, because of an offseason arthroscopic knee surgery. On August 31, he was placed on the physically unable to perform list, where he spent the rest of the season. In November, he had a second surgery performed, to alleviate his lingering knee issue.

2020
Brown slimmed down to be more involved in the passing game, but the team's depth at wide receiver kept him mostly in a blocking and special teams role. In Week 4 against the Cleveland Browns, he had 4 receptions for 43 yards. In Week 12 against the Washington Football Team, he made 3 receptions for 40 yards. He appeared in 16 games with one start, posting 14 receptions for 154 yards.

2021
On March 17, 2021, Brown re-signed with the Cowboys. He was placed on injured reserve on December 9. He was activated on January 1, 2022.

2022
On March 8, 2022, Brown re-signed with the Cowboys.

Houston Texans
On March 17, 2023, Brown signed a one-year contract with the Houston Texans.

References

External links
Dallas Cowboys bio
Ohio State Buckeyes bio

Living people
1996 births
People from Mount Olive Township, New Jersey
Pope John XXIII Regional High School alumni
Sportspeople from Morris County, New Jersey
Players of American football from New Jersey
American football wide receivers
Ohio State Buckeyes football players
Dallas Cowboys players
Houston Texans players